The Stairs Station Hydroelectric Power Plant was built in 1894-1895 in Big Cottonwood Canyon, about  southeast of Salt Lake City, Utah. The plant comprises the powerhouse, switchyard, penstocks, and a pipeline. A dam next to the site is associated with the Granite Power Plant farther downstream, and is part of neither historic district. The powerhouse is the only remaining building associated with the plant. It is an example of an intact high-head generating plant from the late 19th century.

Description
The power plant was originally built with four Pelton wheels, since replaced by a single Francis turbine capable of generating 1.2 megawatts. The station was designed in the Second Renaissance Revival style with two levels, the lower housing the generating equipment, the upper formerly housing switchgear.

A  steel pipeline, now abandoned, connected the dam to a penstock that made the fall to the power plant.

History
The station was designed by Robert M. Jones for his Big Cottonwood Power Company at a cost of $325,000. In 1895 the company contracted to provide power to the Salt Lake and Ogden Gas and Electric Company, In 1897 the Big Cottonwood company was absorbed into the Union Light and Power Company in 1899. An operator's house was demolished on the site at an unknown date.

The Stairs Station was placed on the National Register of Historic Places on April 20, 1989.

See also

 National Register of Historic Places listings in Salt Lake County, Utah
 Granite Hydroelectric Power Plant Historic District

References

External links

 
 

Industrial buildings and structures on the National Register of Historic Places in Utah
Renaissance Revival architecture in Utah
Buildings and structures completed in 1896
Buildings and structures in Salt Lake County, Utah
Historic American Engineering Record in Utah
Hydroelectric power plants in Utah
Historic districts on the National Register of Historic Places in Utah
National Register of Historic Places in Salt Lake County, Utah
Energy infrastructure on the National Register of Historic Places